Kent Liston Lee (July 28, 1923 – August 11, 2017) was a Vice Admiral of the United States Navy. The 36-year veteran of the Navy saw combat in World War II and the Korean War, and commanded the aircraft carrier  during the Vietnam War. He is best known for his work in driving the development and procurement of the F/A-18 Hornet.

Life and career
Lee was born to R. Irby and Hettie (Floyd) Lee in Florence County, South Carolina. He enlisted in the United States Navy on August 15, 1940. In 1942, he entered the flight training program, and was designated naval aviator and commissioned ensign on August 7, 1943. He served with Bomber Squadron 15 and Fighter Squadron 15 on the carrier . With Fighter Squadron 15, he shot down one Japanese aircraft.

After the war, the Navy sent him to Columbia University, where he studied mathematics and physics. In 1954, he received a master's degree in physics from the post-graduate Naval Academy.

His staff command posts included director of the Office of Program Appraisal, deputy director of the Joint Strategic Target Planning Staff, and commander, Naval Air Systems Command. There he was instrumental in the development and acquisition of the F/A-18 Hornet fighter aircraft. Lee retired from that billet on October 31, 1976.

Lee retired in Charlottesville, Virginia. He and his wife, Mary Edith "Mimi" (Buckley) Lee (July 2, 1924 – March 3, 2019), were married for 69 years and had three daughters and nine grandchildren. Kent Lee died in August 2017 at the age of 94. Lee and his wife are buried in Arlington National Cemetery.

References

1923 births
2017 deaths
People from Florence County, South Carolina
United States Naval Aviators
United States Navy pilots of World War II
Columbia University alumni
United States Navy personnel of the Korean War
Naval Postgraduate School alumni
United States Navy personnel of the Vietnam War
United States Navy admirals
Recipients of the Navy Distinguished Service Medal
Recipients of the Legion of Merit
Recipients of the Air Medal
People from Charlottesville, Virginia
Burials at Arlington National Cemetery
Military personnel from South Carolina